Asthena lactularia is a moth in the family Geometridae first described by Gottlieb August Wilhelm Herrich-Schäffer in 1855. It is found in southern Spain.

Taxonomy
The species is sometimes treated as a subspecies of Asthena anseraria.

References

Moths described in 1855
Asthena
Moths of Europe